United Nations General Assembly Resolution 3212 was adopted on 1 November 1974, after statements in  debate and the Report of the Special Political Committee on the Question of Cyprus regarding the Turkish invasion of Cyprus.

Resolution
The United Nations General Assembly:

"1. Calls upon all states to respect the sovereignty, independence, territorial
integrity and non-alignment of the Republic of Cyprus and to refrain from all acts and interventions directed against it;

"2. Urges the speedy withdrawal of all foreign armed forces and foreign military
presence and personnel from the Republic of Cyprus and the cessation of all
foreign interference in its affairs;

"3. Considers that the constitutional system of the Republic of Cyprus
concerns the Greek-Cypriot and Turkish-Cypriot communities;

"4. Commends the contacts and negotiations taking place on an equal footing,
with the good offices of the Secretary-General between the representatives of
the two communities, and calls for their continuation with a view to reaching
freely a mutually acceptable political settlement, based on their fundamental
and legitimate rights;

"5. Considers that all the refugees should return to their homes in safety and
calls upon the parties concerned to undertake urgent measures to that end;

"6. Expresses the hope that, if necessary, further efforts including negotiations can take place, within the framework of the United Nations, for the purpose of implementing the provisions of the present resolution, thus ensuring to the Republic of Cyprus its fundamental right to independence, sovereignty and territorial integrity"

The resolution was adopted by 117 votes in favour, none against and no abstentions.

See also

 Cyprus dispute
 List of United Nations Security Council Resolutions 501 to 600 (1982–1987)
 United Nations Buffer Zone in Cyprus
 Turkish Invasion of Cyprus

References

External links
Data

November 1974 events
1974 in Cyprus
United Nations General Assembly resolutions